Kevin Johns (born December 4, 1975) is an American football coach. He is the offensive coordinator at Duke University, a position he has held since January 2022. Previously, Johns served in the same role the at Indiana University Bloomington, Western Michigan University, Texas Tech University, and  the University of Memphis.

Career

Early coaching career
Johns graduated from the University of Dayton, where he played quarterback for Flyers. He was an assistant coach for seven seasons at Northwestern under head coaches Randy Walker and Pat Fitzgerald, as well as two seasons at FCS Richmond.

Indiana
In 2011, he accepted the co-offensive coordinator position at Indiana under new head coach Kevin Wilson. From 2014 to 2016, Johns served as the offensive coordinator for the Hoosiers.

Western Michigan
In 2017, Johns joined the staff of Tim Lester as offensive coordinator and quarterbacks coach for the Western Michigan Broncos football team.

Texas Tech
In 2018, Johns joined the staff of Kliff Kingsbury as offensive coordinator and receivers coach at Texas Tech University. At the conclusion of the 2018 season Kingsbury and his coaching staff, including Johns, was fired by Texas Tech.

Memphis
In 2019, Johns became the offensive coordinator and quarterbacks coach at the University of Memphis.

Duke
On January 5, 2022, Johns joined Mike Elko's inaugural staff at Duke as the offensive coordinator and quarterbacks coach.

Personal
Johns received his bachelor's degree in mathematics from the University of Dayton in 1998. He then received a master's degree from Northwestern University in 2001. Johns and his wife, Krista, have three sons.

References

External links
 Duke profile
 Texas Tech profile
 Indiana profile
 Northwestern profile

1975 births
Living people
American football quarterbacks
Dayton Flyers football players
Duke Blue Devils football coaches
Northwestern Wildcats football coaches
Richmond Spiders football coaches
Indiana Hoosiers football coaches
Texas Tech Red Raiders football coaches
Western Michigan Broncos football coaches
High school football coaches in Ohio
People from Piqua, Ohio
Coaches of American football from Ohio
Players of American football from Ohio